Dictyacium is a genus of flies in the family Sciomyzidae. There are at least two described species in Dictyacium.

Species
D. ambiguum (Loew, 1864)
D. firmum Steyskal, 1956

References

Further reading

External links

 

Acalyptratae
Sciomyzoidea genera